V. Milou Mackenzie is an American politician. She is a Republican member of the Pennsylvania House of Representatives, representing the 131st district since 2021.

Biography
Mackenzie graduated from Nazareth High School in 1968 and received a BA in English from Cedar Crest College in 1972.

In 2020, Mackenzie was elected to the Pennsylvania House of Representatives representing the 131st District, which includes parts of Northampton County, Lehigh County, and Montgomery County. She defeated Democratic candidate Kevin Branco with 54.3% of the vote in the general election. Mackenzie is the mother of House of Representatives member Ryan Mackenzie of Pennsylvania's 187th District.

Mackenzie currently sits on the Children & Youth, Education, Human Services, and Urban Affairs committees.

References

External links
www.repmiloumackenziepa.com
Pennsylvania House of Representatives profile

Living people
Nazareth Area High School alumni
Republican Party members of the Pennsylvania House of Representatives
21st-century American women politicians
Women in Pennsylvania politics
Women state legislators in Pennsylvania
21st-century American politicians
Year of birth missing (living people)